Mohammad Reza Geraei (born 25 July 1996), is an Iranian Greco-Roman wrestler. At the 2020 Summer Olympics held in Tokyo, Japan, he won the gold medal in the men's 67 kg event. In 2018, he won one of the bronze medals in the men's 67 kg event at the Asian Games held in Jakarta, Indonesia.

Career 

In 2019, he won the gold medal in the 72 kg event at the 2019 Asian Wrestling Championships held in Xi'an, China. At the 2019 World U23 Wrestling Championship held in Budapest, Hungary, he won the gold medal in the men's 72 kg event. In the final, he defeated Sanan Suleymanov of Azerbaijan. In the same year, he also won the silver medal in the 77 kg event at the 2019 Asian U23 Wrestling Championship held in Ulaanbaatar, Mongolia.
At the 2021 Asian Wrestling Olympic Qualification Tournament held in Almaty, Kazakhstan, he won the gold medal in the men's 67 kg. He qualified for the Tokyo Olympics by winning the semi-finals.

World U23 Championship 2019 
In the weight category of 72 kg, Mohammad Reza Garai passed the barrier of last year's champion Genghis Arsalan 10: 3 in the first round with a result of 10: 3. At this stage, Garai defeated Ramaz Zweidze, the silver medalist of the world under-23s from Georgia, with a result of 7: 5 and a technical blow, and reached the semi-finals. In this match, he defeated Maksim Yutoshenko from Ukraine with a result of 6 to 2 and advanced to the final match. In the final match, he defeated Suleimanov of Azerbaijan with a score of 7: 0 and won the gold medal.

Asian Championship 2019 
In the 72 kg weight category, Mohammad Reza Garai, after a break in the first round, won the second round with a score of 8: 0 against Aram Wardanian, an Asian bronze medalist from Uzbekistan, and reached the semi-finals. At this stage, he crossed the barrier of world silver medalist Dimio Jadryev from Kazakhstan with a result of 9: 3 and reached the final match. In the final, Garai defeated Hugh Joon Zhang of China 5-0 in the final to win the gold medal.

Asian Games 2018 
In the first round, Mohammad Reza Garai defeated Abdul Karim al-Hassan Suri in the first round, and in the second round, he defeated Olympic and world bronze medalist Al-Murat Tasmuradov of Uzbekistan to advance to the semifinals. In this match, he competed against the Kazakh Almaty Kabispayev, the silver and bronze medalist of the world, who was defeated by a technical blow at the very beginning of the wrestling and failed to reach the final. In the 67 kg weight class, Garai competed against Taiwan's Hong Ying-hova, defeating his opponent 11-0 in less than a minute to win the bronze medal.

Personal life 

His older brother Mohammadali Geraei also competes in the Greco-Roman wrestling.

Greco-roman record 

! colspan="7"| International Senior GRECO-ROMAN Matches
|-
!  Res.
!  Record
!  Opponent
!  Score
!  Date
!  Event
!  Location
|-
! style=background:white colspan=7 |
|-
|Win
|16-0
|align=left| Nazir Abdullaev
|style="font-size:88%"|5-2
|style="font-size:88%"|October 9, 2021
|style="font-size:88%" rowspan=4|2021 World Championships
|style="text-align:left;font-size:88%;" rowspan=4| Oslo, Norway
|-
|Win
|15-0
|align=left| Ramaz Zoidze
|style="font-size:88%"|7-6
|style="font-size:88%" rowspan=3|October 8, 2021
|-
|Win
|14-0
|align=left| Hasrat Jafarov
|style="font-size:88%"|TF 11–0
|-
|Win
|13-0
|align=left| Shimoyamada Tsuchika
|style="font-size:88%"|6-5
|-
! style=background:white colspan=7 |
|-
|Win
|12-0
|align=left| Parviz Nasibov
|style="font-size:88%"|9-1
|style="font-size:88%" rowspan=4|August 3-4, 2021
|style="font-size:88%" rowspan=4|2020 Summer Olympics
|style="text-align:left;font-size:88%;" rowspan=4|
 Tokyo, Japan
|-
|Win
|11-0
|align=left| Ramaz Zoidze
|style="font-size:88%"|6-1
|-
|Win
|10-0
|align=left| Frank Stäbler
|style="font-size:88%"|TF 5-5
|-
|Win
|9-0
|align=left| Horta Stiven
|style="font-size:88%"|9-0
|-
! style=background:white colspan=7 |
|-
|Win
|8-0
|align=left| SANAN SOLEYMANOV
|style="font-size:88%"|TF 7-0
|style="font-size:88%" rowspan=5|October 28–30, 2019
|style="font-size:88%" rowspan=5|2019 U23 World Championships
|style="text-align:left;font-size:88%;" rowspan=5|
 Budapest, Hungary
|-
|Win
|7–0
|align=left| MAXIM KELASHINKOV
|style="font-size:88%"|TF 9-3
|-
|Win
|6-0
|align=left| Ramaz Zoidze
|style="font-size:88%"|TF 7-5
|-
|Win
|5–0
|align=left| MAGMOD YARBILOV
|style="font-size:88%"|TF 3-2
|-
|Win
|4–0
|align=left| CHENGIZ ARSALAN
|style="font-size:88%"|TF 9-3
|-
! style=background:white colspan=7 |
|-
|Win
|3-0
|align=left| Zhang hujun
|style="font-size:88%"| 5–0
|style="font-size:88%" rowspan=3|24 April 2019
|style="font-size:88%" rowspan=3|2019 Asian Continental Championships
|style="text-align:left;font-size:88%;" rowspan=3| Xi'an, China
|-
|Win
|2-0
|align=left| Demo zhadarev
|style="font-size:88%"| 9–3
|-
|Win
|1-0
|align=left| aram vardanian
|style="font-size:88%"| 9–0

Achievements

References

External links 
 
 
 
 
 

1996 births
Living people
People from Shiraz
Iranian male sport wrestlers
Wrestlers at the 2018 Asian Games
Asian Games medalists in wrestling
Asian Games bronze medalists for Iran
Medalists at the 2018 Asian Games
Wrestlers at the 2020 Summer Olympics
Olympic wrestlers of Iran
Medalists at the 2020 Summer Olympics
Olympic medalists in wrestling
Olympic gold medalists for Iran
World Wrestling Championships medalists
Sportspeople from Fars province
21st-century Iranian people
World Wrestling Champions